The Department of Biotechnology (DBT) is an Indian government department, under the Ministry of Science and Technology responsible for administrating development and commercialisation in the field of modern biology and biotechnology in India. It was set up in 1986.

Leadership

Institutes 
Autonomous Institutes

 Center of Innovative and Applied Bioprocessing, Mohali
 Centre for DNA Fingerprinting and Diagnostics, Hyderabad
 National Institute of Animal Biotechnology, Hyderabad
 National Institute of Biomedical Genomics, Kalyani
 National Centre for Cell Science, Pune
 National Brain Research Centre, Manesar
 Kalam Institute of Health Technology, Visakhapatnam
 Regional Centre for Biotechnology, Faridabad
 Rajiv Gandhi Centre for Biotechnology, Thiruvananthapuram
 National Institute of Immunology Delhi
 National Institute of Plant Genome Research Delhi
 Translational Health Science and Technology Institute, Faridabad
 Institute of Life Sciences, Bhubaneswar
 Institute of Bioresources and Sustainable Development Imphal
 National Agri-Food Biotechnology Institute, Mohali
 Institute for Stem Cell Science and Regenerative Medicine (inStem)

New institutes

 National Immunogenicity and Biologics Evaluation Center
Public Sector Undertakings
Bharat Immunologicals and Biologicals Corporation Limited, Bulandshahr
Indian Vaccine Corporation Limited Delhi
Biotech Consortium India Limited, New Delhi
Biotechnology Industry Research Assistance Council (BIRAC), to strategically empower emerging biotech companies.

Supported laboratories

 NIMHANS-IOB Laboratory, the  Institute of Bioinformatics (IOB) and  NIMHANS collaborative laboratory

National Biotechnology Development Strategy
In December 2015, the Department of Biotechnology launched the National Biotechnology Development Strategy 2015–2020 programme. The stated aim of the programme is to intensify research in the fields of vaccines, humane genome, infectious and chronic diseases, crop science, animal agriculture and aqua culture, food and nutrition, environmental management and technologies for clean energy. The mission, through stakeholders in the biotechnology and technology domains is backed with significant investments to create new products, creating a strong infrastructure for research and development, commercialization, and empowering human resources scientifically and technologically.

See also
Maharaj Kishan Bhan

References

External links

Ministry of Science and Technology (India)
Biotechnology organizations
Biotechnology in India
1986 establishments in Kerala
Government agencies established in 1986